The Individual large hill/10 km event of the FIS Nordic World Ski Championships 2017 was held on 1 March 2017.

Results

Ski jumping
The ski jumping part was held at 12:00.

Cross-country skiing
The cross-country skiing part was held at 16:15.

References

Individual large hill 10 km